The fawn hopping mouse (Notomys cervinus) is a rodent native to the central Australian desert. Like all hopping mice it has strong front teeth, a long tail, dark eyes, big ears, well-developed haunches and very long, narrow hind feet.

The coloration of the fawn hopping mouse varies from pale pinkish-fawn to grey on the upper parts, and white underneath.

The favoured habitat is the sparsely vegetated arid gibber plains and claypans of the Lake Eyre Basin, including parts of northern South Australia, far south-western Queensland and possibly the Northern Territory, though this last is uncertain. Records from the late 19th century show that its former range was more extensive including western New South Wales.

Breeding is thought to be opportunistic. In captivity, gestation is about 40 days and between one and five fully furred young are born.

Fawn hopping mice live in small family groups of two to four individuals. During the day, they shelter in burrows which are simpler and shallower than those of the sand-dwelling dusky hopping mouse but nevertheless up to a metre deep with between one and three entrances. At night, they forage outwards for hundreds of metres, searching for seeds, and also taking green shoots and insects if the opportunity presents itself. As with other hopping mice, they do not need to drink, though they can metabolise highly saline water if it is available.

The fawn hopping mouse is classified as vulnerable. The causes of its decline are unknown, but assumed to be habitat degradation, competition for food with introduced species, and predation by introduced cats and foxes.

References 

 

Notomys
Mammals of South Australia
Mammals of the Northern Territory
Mammals of New South Wales
Rodents of Australia
Mammals described in 1853